Solingen – Remscheid – Wuppertal II is an electoral constituency (German: Wahlkreis) represented in the Bundestag. It elects one member via first-past-the-post voting. Under the current constituency numbering system, it is designated as constituency 103. It is located in western North Rhine-Westphalia, comprising the cities of Solingen, Remscheid, and small parts of Wuppertal.

Solingen – Remscheid – Wuppertal II was created for the inaugural 1949 federal election. Since 2021, it has been represented by Ingo Schäfer of the Social Democratic Party (SPD).

Geography
Solingen – Remscheid – Wuppertal II is located in western North Rhine-Westphalia. As of the 2021 federal election, it comprises the entirety of the independent cities of Solingen and Remscheid, as well as the districts of Cronenberg and Ronsdorf from the independent city of Wuppertal.

History
Solingen – Remscheid – Wuppertal II was created in 1949, then known as Remscheid – Solingen. From 1965 through 1976, it was named Solingen. From 1980 through 1998, it was named Solingen – Remscheid. It acquired its current name in the 2002 election. In the 1949 election, it was North Rhine-Westphalia constituency 15 in the numbering system. From 1953 through 1961, it was number 74. From 1965 through 1998, it was number 71. From 2002 through 2009, it was number 104. Since 2013, it has been number 103.

Originally, the constituency comprised the cities of Solingen and Remscheid. In the 1965 through 1976 elections, it was coterminous with Solingen. In the 1980 through 1998 elections, it again comprised Solingen and Remscheid. It acquired its current borders in the 2002 election.

Members
The constituency was first represented by Hermann Runge of the Social Democratic Party (SPD) from 1949 to 1953. It was won by the Christian Democratic Union (CDU) in 1953 and represented by Fritz Hellwig for a single term, followed by fellow CDU member Franz Etzel for two terms. Arthur Killat of the CDU was elected in 1965 and served until 1972, when the SPD won the constituency. Heinz Schreiber then served until 1983, when Bernd Wilz of the CDU was elected. He served three terms before SPD candidate Hans-Werner Bertl won in 1994. He was succeeded in 2005 by Jürgen Kucharczyk, who served a single term. The CDU's Jürgen Hardt was elected in 2009 and re-elected in 2013 and 2017. Ingo Schäfer regained the constituency for the SPD in 2021.

Election results

2021 election

2017 election

2013 election

2009 election

References

Federal electoral districts in North Rhine-Westphalia
Solingen
Remscheid
Wuppertal
Constituencies established in 1949
1949 establishments in West Germany